Callionymus leucopoecilus, the Korean darter dragonet, is a species of dragonet native to the Pacific waters around the Korean Peninsula.  The males of this species grow to a length of  SL while the females reach  SL.

References 

L
Fish described in 1993
Taxa named by Ronald Fricke